The twenty-seventh government of Israel was formed by Benjamin Netanyahu of Likud on 18 June 1996. Although his Likud-Gesher-Tzomet alliance won fewer seats than Labor, Netanyahu formed the government after winning the country's first ever direct election for Prime Minister, narrowly defeating incumbent Shimon Peres. This government was the first formed by an Israeli national born in the state after independence in 1948 (the seventeenth government of 1974–1977 was the first to be formed by a native-born Israeli, although Rabin was born in the territory prior to independence).

Together with Likud-Gesher-Tzomet, Netanyahu also included Shas, the National Religious Party, Yisrael BaAliyah, United Torah Judaism and the Third Way in the government, with the coalition holding 66 of the 120 seats in the Knesset. The government was also supported, but not joined, by the two-seat Moledet faction. Gesher left the coalition on 6 January 1998, but the government remained in place until 6 July 1999, when Ehud Barak formed the twenty-eighth government after defeating Netanyahu in the 1999 election for Prime Minister.

Cabinet members

1 Died in office.

2 Although Arens was not a Knesset member at the time, he had previously been an MK for Likud.

3 Although Suissa was not a Knesset member at the time, he was elected to the Knesset on the Shas list in 1999.

4 The name of the post was changed to Minister of National Infrastructure on 8 July 1996.

References

External links
Twelfth Knesset: Government 27 Knesset website

 27
1996 establishments in Israel
1999 disestablishments in Israel
Cabinets established in 1996
Cabinets disestablished in 1999
1996 in Israeli politics
1997 in Israeli politics
1998 in Israeli politics
1999 in Israeli politics
 27
+27